The 2019 Rugby Europe Women's Sevens Trophy is the second division of Rugby Europe's 2019 sevens season. This edition is due to be hosted by the cities of Budapest and Lisbon on 8–23 June. The two highest-placed teams will be promoted to the 2020 Grand Prix and eligible to compete in the European Olympic qualifying tournament. The two teams with the fewest points will be relegated to the 2020 Conference.

Schedule

Standings

Budapest

All times in Central European Summer Time (UTC+02:00)

Pool Stage

Pool A

Pool B

Pool C

Knockout stage

9th Place

5th Place

Cup

Lisbon

All times in Western European Summer Time (UTC+01:00)

Pool Stage

Pool A

Pool B

Pool C

Knockout stage

9th Place

5th Place

Cup

External links
 Tournament page

References

2019
2019 rugby sevens competitions
rugby union
rugby union
Europe
Europe
International sports competitions in Budapest
Sports competitions in Lisbon
Trophy